Clubul Sportiv Orășenesc Voluntari 2005, commonly known as CSO Voluntari or simply Voluntari, is a Romanian multi-sport club based in Voluntari who was founded at the initiative of the office of the Mayor of Voluntari. The club currently has 13 active departments ranging from basketball to contact sports like kickboxing, and even dance sport. As of 2021, the club has over 1000 active children in its departments. In March 2021, the club won the Romanian Basketball Cup, and played the Semifinal of the 2020–21 Liga Națională.

In the 2021–22 season, Voluntari entered the qualifying rounds of the FIBA Europe Cup, marking the club's debut in European competitions.

Honours
Liga Națională
Runners-up (1): 2022

Romanian Cup
Champions (2): 2021, 2022

Departments
Active branches:
Athletics
Badminton
Basketball
Boxing
Dancesport
Field Hockey
Handball
Karate Goju-Ryu
Karate Shotokan
Kickboxing
Swimming (sport)
Table tennis
Volleyball

Current men's basketball roster

In Europe

Notable players

Anthony Hickey (born 1992), basketball player for Hapoel Haifa in the Israeli Basketball Premier League

Current women's volleyball roster
As of January 2022

References

External links

2005 establishments in Romania
Basketball teams in Romania
Basketball teams established in 2005